Admiralty Gulf is a gulf in the Kimberley region of Western Australia that opens into the Indian Ocean.

Description
The Gulf is bounded by the Bougainville Peninsula to the north and Bigge Point to the south.

Many islands are found within the Gulf, including Middle Osborn Island, Kingsmill Island, Borda Island and the Montesquieu Islands (including the Low Rocks and Sterna Island Important Bird Area). Two natural harbours are found in the Gulf, Port Warrender and Walmesly Bay.

History
The traditional owners of the areas around the gulf are the Wenamba peoples to the west and the Kambure peoples to the east.

Nicolas Baudin charted Cape Bougainville in 1803 and Cassini Island and was most likely the first European to visit the Gulf.

The coastline around the Gulf was explored by  Philip Parker King aboard Mermaid in 1819 as part of his survey of the area. King named the Gulf along with Port Warrender and Vansittart Bay.

References

Gulfs of Australia
Kimberley (Western Australia)
Bays of Western Australia